The Ice Hockey Federation of Ukraine (Federatsiya khokeyu Ukrayiny (FHU) is the official governing body for ice hockey in Ukraine. It became a member of the International Ice Hockey Federation (IIHF) on May 6, 1992.

Presidents
 1992-1997 : Anatoli Khorozov
 1997-2006 : Oleksandr Omelchenko
 2006-present : Anatoly Brezvin Ivanovich
 2020 : Gennadiy Zubko

National teams
  Ukraine men's national ice hockey team
  Ukraine men's national junior ice hockey team
  Ukraine men's national under-18 ice hockey team
  Ukraine women's national ice hockey team

Competitions
 Ukrainian Hockey Championship
 Professional Hockey League, a failed attempt of establishing a self-governing professional competition among men's ice hockey clubs
 Extra competitions, beside of regular format competitions the federation organized several other competitions: 2007 Ukrainian Cup, 2008 Ukrainian Federation Cup, and 2010 Ukrainian Federation Cup
 Amateur competitions (Western Ukrainian Amateur Hockey League, others)

Professional hockey clubs
 HC Donbass
Former
 HC Dynamo (Kharkiv), a Soviet team out of Kharkiv
 Sokil Kiev
 HC Berkut-Kiev, initially a farm team of Sokil Kiev
 hockey team of the School of Higher Sport Master (Kiev)

References

External links
 Official website  
 Ukraine at IIHF.com

Ice hockey in Ukraine
Ice Hockey
Ukraine
Ukraine
Sports organizations established in 1992
Collective members of the National Olympic Committee of Ukraine